Kuvungen Hill is a hill just southeast of Framranten Point, near the southwest end of the Kirwan Escarpment in Queen Maud Land, Antarctica. It was mapped and named by Norwegian cartographers from surveys and air photos by the Norwegian–British–Swedish Antarctic Expedition (1949–52) and additional air photos (1958–59).

Framranten Point extends northwestward from the hill.

References

Hills of Queen Maud Land
Princess Martha Coast